The Public Interest Legal Foundation (PILF) is an American conservative legal group based in Indianapolis, Indiana, which is known for suing states and local governments to purge voters from election rolls. The nonprofit was constituted in 2012.

PILF asserts that "large numbers of ineligible aliens are registering to vote and casting ballots", although lists that they have displayed of such supposed voters prove to actually include American natives who are eligible voters. PILF said its lists had been based on state government lists of declared “non-citizens” removed from local voter rolls, but some U.S. citizens were wrongfully purged in the process. The group has made false claims about the extent of voter fraud in the United States, and the organization has published the information of eligible voters online, including Social Security numbers, falsely accusing them of being fraudulent voters.

Activities 
The Public Interest Legal Foundation was established in 2012. The organization is a 501(c)(3) non-profit American corporation currently based in Indianapolis, Indiana.

The group has been involved in legal cases in Texas, North Carolina, Florida, Pennsylvania, Indiana, Nevada, Virginia, Kansas, D.C., and Mississippi. The organization has filed documents in favor of a Florida law barring ex-convicts who owe fines from voting. PILF has also participated as a primary party or intervenor in the U.S. Third Circuit Court of Appeals, Eleventh Circuit Court of Appeals, and the Court of Appeals for the Federal Circuit. The organization also submits amicus curiae briefs to the U.S. Supreme Court on election-related issues.

PILF has sent mailings to hundreds of counties claiming that their voting rolls are provably corrupt; Politifact has judged these claims to be "false", stating that "inactive" registrants should not be counted with "active" ones when calculating total rates of voter registration. The foundation originally flagged jurisdictions with more registered voters than resident adults, according to annual U.S. Census population estimates at the time. ProPublica found major counting errors in PlLF's use of government data; PlLF subsequently corrected its analysis.

In 2016 and 2017, the organization published the information of eligible voters online, including Social Security numbers, falsely accusing them of being fraudulent voters. One such voter was a U.S. missionary in Guatemala who, based on PILF's report, was inaccurately highlighted as a fraudulent voter in a Washington Times article. In 2018, the Richmond Council for the League of United Latin American Citizens and four individual voters filed a federal lawsuit, LULAC of Richmond v. Public Interest Legal Foundation, in the Eastern District of Virginia against the PILF for these false reports. The lawsuit claimed violations of the Ku Klux Klan Act and the Voting Rights Act, as well as state defamation laws. PILF settled the lawsuit by removing the personal information from its website and adding a statement to its reports saying "PILF recognizes that individuals in [the removed exhibits] were in fact citizens and that these citizens did not commit felonies. PILF profoundly regrets any characterization of those registrants as felons or instances of registration or voting as felonies."

Organization
The organization's current president and general counsel is J. Christian Adams, an American attorney and conservative activist formerly employed by the United States Department of Justice under the George W. Bush administration. Adams has described those who say there is no comprehensive proof of systemic voter fraud as "flat-earthers", and opposes automatic voter registration, saying that voter registration should require "forethought and initiative, something lacking in large segments of the Democrat base." In 2017 Adams was chosen by President Donald Trump to be a member of his Presidential Advisory Commission on Election Integrity.

Director Hans von Spakovsky is an American attorney and a former member of the Federal Election Commission (FEC). He is the manager of the Heritage Foundation's Election Law Reform Initiative and a senior legal fellow in Heritage's Meese Center for Legal and Judicial Studies. He is an advocate for more restrictive voting laws. He has been described as playing an influential role in making alarmism about voter fraud mainstream in the Republican Party, despite no evidence of widespread voter fraud. His work claiming voting fraud is rampant has been discredited. In 2017 President Donald J. Trump named him to be a member of the Presidential Advisory Commission on Election Integrity.

Lawsuits

In 2018 PILF sued Harris County, Texas, Tax Assessor-Collector and Voter Registrar Ann Bennett alleging violations of the National Voter Registration Act of 1993. The complaint claimed Bennett's office refused access to records of registered voters identified as noncitizens and what actions the office had taken in regard to these registrations. The lawsuit was settled in March 2020, allowing PILF access to the records.

In December 2019, PILF filed a lawsuit against the City of Detroit, claiming that the city failed to maintain voter registration records as required by federal and state laws. The suit was dropped in July 2020 after  actions by Detroit Clerk Janice Winfrey and Elections Director George Azzouz to review and remove likely deceased registrants on a list provided by the plaintiff.

In February 2020, PILF sued Maine Secretary of State Matt Dunlap for alleged violation of the Public Disclosure Provision of the Voting Rights Act of 1965. The complaint claims Dunlap's office illegally denied the group access to the state's list of registered voters, preventing full public access and monitoring of the rolls as provided by Public Disclosure Provision of the act. State law enumerates those who the list is to be made available to, including to organizations specifically involved in "get out the vote" efforts. The suit states that they were denied the list due to not being involved in such efforts.

Also in February 2020, PILF sued Allegheny County, Pennsylvania, alleging violations of the National Voter Registration Act of 1993 for not making a "reasonable effort" to remove the names of ineligible voters from its voter registration rolls. In December 2019, Pennsylvania Auditor General Eugene DePasquale found in an audit of the county's voter rolls that about 42,000 active records should have been placed into inactive status because of five years of inactivity.

In August 2020, PILF filed a lawsuit against Michigan Secretary of State Jocelyn Benson for failing to act on a request to disclose voting records related to the 2018 general election from the city of Southfield. The foundation sought records of 193 allegedly altered voter history files from November 2018 that led to six felony charges against Southfield City Clerk Sherikia Hawkins in the altering of ballot records.

Board of Directors
 J. Christian Adams, President
 Cleta Mitchell, Chairman
 Ken Blackwell, Treasurer
 William E. Davis, Director
 David A. Norcross, Director
 Brad Schlozman, Director
 Hans von Spakovsky, Director
 Clara Belle Wheeler, Director

References

External links

"Does the U.S. Have Millions More Registered Voters Than Eligible Adults?", Snopes.com

Electoral fraud in the United States
Oversight and watchdog organizations
Government oversight and watchdog organizations
2012 establishments in the United States
Non-profit organizations based in Indianapolis
Political organizations based in the United States
501(c)(3) organizations
Civil affairs
Non-governmental organizations
Political advocacy groups in the United States
Conservative organizations in the United States